Rough ride may refer to:

 Rough Ride (book), a 1990 bicycling autobiography
 Rough ride (police brutality), in which a prisoner is restrained, put into a police vehicle, and then thrown about as the vehicle is driven erratically
 The Rough Ride, a Hong Kong television series which premiered in 1985
 Rough Ride, a song on the 1989 Paul McCartney album Flowers in the Dirt

See also
 Rough Rider (film)
 Rough Riders (disambiguation)